The Pink Legacy is a pink diamond that was purchased by Harry Winston, Inc. in 2018. It was renamed Winston Pink Legacy by CEO Nayla Hayek. The diamond was sold at a Christie's auction for 50.375 million Swiss francs ($50m), and at $2.6 million per carat it set a world record at the time of its sale for a pink diamond.

Pink Legacy was mined in South Africa around 1918 and was once owned by the Oppenheimer family, who ran De Beers. It has a cut-cornered rectangular cut, and has likely not been altered since it was first cut in 1920. It is mounted in a platinum ring.

See also
Darya-ye Noor
Graff Pink
List of diamonds
Pink Star (diamond)

References

Individual diamonds
Pink diamonds